Muzaffer Tokaç (29 September 1922 – 14 July 2009) was a Turkish footballer. He competed in the men's tournament at the 1952 Summer Olympics.

References

External links
 

1922 births
2009 deaths
Turkish footballers
Turkey international footballers
Olympic footballers of Turkey
Footballers at the 1952 Summer Olympics
Association football forwards
Galatasaray S.K. footballers
Footballers from Istanbul